In Greek mythology, Deucalion was the son of Prometheus; ancient sources name his mother as Clymene, Hesione, or Pronoia. He is closely connected with the flood myth in Greek mythology.

Etymology 
"sailor, seaman, fisher". His wife Pyrrha's name derives from the adjective , -ά, -όν, pyrrhós, -á, -ón, i.e. "flame-colored, orange".

Family 
Of Deucalion's birth, the Argonautica (from the 3rd century BC) stated:

Deucalion and Pyrrha had at least two children, Hellen and Protogenea, and possibly a third, Amphictyon (who is autochthonous in other traditions). 

Their children as apparently named in one of the oldest texts, Catalogue of Women, include daughters Pandora and Thyia, and at least one son, Hellen. Their descendants were said to have dwelt and ruled in Thessaly. 

One source mentioned three sons of Deucalion and his wife: Orestheus, Marathonios and Pronous (father of Hellen). In some accounts, Deucalion's other children were Melantho, mother of Delphus by Poseidon and Candybus who gave his name to the town of Candyba in Lycia.

Mythology

Deluge accounts 
The flood in the time of Deucalion was caused by the anger of Zeus, ignited by the hubris of Lycaon and his sons, descendants of Pelasgus. According to this story, King Lycaon of Arcadia had sacrificed a boy to Zeus, who, appalled by this offering, decided to put an end to the Bronze Age by unleashing a deluge. During this catastrophic flood, the rivers ran in torrents and the sea flooded the coastal plain, engulfing the foothills with spray, and washing everything clean.

Deucalion, with the aid of his father Prometheus, was saved from this deluge by building a chest. Like the biblical Noah and the Mesopotamian counterpart Utnapishtim, he used this device to survive the great flood with his wife, Pyrrha.

The fullest accounts were provided in Ovid's Metamorphoses (late 1 BCE to early 1 CE) and in the Library of Pseudo-Apollodorus. Deucalion, who reigned over the region of Phthia, had been forewarned of the flood by his father Prometheus. Deucalion was to build a chest and provision it carefully (no animals are rescued in this version of the flood myth), so that when the waters receded after nine days, he and his wife Pyrrha, daughter of Epimetheus, were the one surviving pair of humans. Their chest touched solid ground on Mount Parnassus, or Mount Etna in Sicily, or Mount Athos in Chalkidiki, or Mount Othrys in Thessaly.

Hyginus mentioned the opinion of a Hegesianax that Deucalion is to be identified with Aquarius, "because during his reign such quantities of water poured from the sky that the great Flood resulted."

Once the deluge was over and the couple had given thanks to Zeus, Deucalion (said in several of the sources to have been aged 82 at the time) consulted an oracle of Themis about how to repopulate the earth. He was told to "cover your head and throw the bones of your mother behind your shoulder". Deucalion and Pyrrha understood that "mother" was Gaia, the mother of all living things, and the "bones" to be rocks. They threw the rocks behind their shoulders and the stones formed people. Pyrrha's became women; Deucalion's became men. These people were later called the Leleges who populated Locris. This can be related to Pindar's account that recounted ". . .Pyrrha and Deucalion came down from Parnassus and made their first home, and without the marriage-bed they founded a unified race of stone offspring, and the stones gave the people their name."

The 2nd-century AD writer Lucian gave an account of the Greek Deucalion in De Dea Syria that seems to refer more to the Near Eastern flood legends: in his version, Deucalion (whom he also calls Sisythus) took his children, their wives, and pairs of animals with him on the ark, and later built a great temple in Manbij (northern Syria), on the site of the chasm that received all the waters; he further describes how pilgrims brought vessels of sea water to this place twice a year, from as far as Arabia and Mesopotamia, to commemorate this event.

Variant stories 
On the other hand, Dionysius of Halicarnassus stated Deucalion's parents to be Prometheus and Clymene, daughter of Oceanus, and mentioned nothing about a flood but instead named him as commander of those from Parnassus who drove the "sixth generation" of Pelasgians from Thessaly.

One of the earliest Greek historians, Hecataeus of Miletus, was said to have written a book about Deucalion, but it no longer survived. The only extant fragment of his to mention Deucalion does not mention the flood either, but named him as the father of Orestheus, king of Aetolia. The much later geographer Pausanias, following on this tradition, named Deucalion as a king of Ozolian Locris and father of Orestheus.

Plutarch mentioned a legend that Deucalion and Pyrrha had settled in Dodona, Epirus; while Strabo asserted that they lived at Cynus, and that her grave was still to be found there, while his may be seen at Athens. This can be related to an account that after the deluge, Deucalion, founder and king of Lycoreia in Mt. Parnassus was said to have fled from his kingdom to Athens with his sons Hellen and Amphictyon during the reign of King Cranaus. Shortly thereafter, Deucalion died there and was said to have been buried near Athens. During his stay in there, he was credited with having built the ancient sanctuary of Olympian Zeus. Additionally, Strabo mentioned a pair of Aegean islands named after the couple.

Interpretation

Mosaic accretions 
The 19th-century classicist John Lemprière, in Bibliotheca Classica, argued that as the story had been re-told in later versions, it accumulated details from the stories of Noah: "Thus Apollodorus gives Deucalion a great chest as a means of safety; Plutarch speaks of the pigeons by which he sought to find out whether the waters had receded; and Lucian of the animals of every kind which he had taken with him. &c." However, the Epic of Gilgamesh contains each of the three elements identified by Lemprière: a means of safety (in the form of instructions to build a boat), sending forth birds to test whether the waters had receded, and stowing animals of every kind on the boat.  These facts were unknown to Lemprière because the Assyrian cuneiform tablets containing the Gilgamesh Epic were not discovered until in the 1850s. This was 20 years after Lemprière had published his "Bibliotheca Classica". The Gilgamesh epic is widely considered to be at least as old as Genesis, if not older.  Given the prevalence of religious syncretism in the ancient Greek world, these three elements may already have been known to some Greek-speaking peoples in popular oral variations of the flood myth, long before they were recorded in writing. The most immediate source of these three particular elements in the later Greek versions is unclear.

Dating by early scholars 
For some time during the Middle Ages, many European Christian scholars continued to accept Greek mythical history at face value, thus asserting that Deucalion's flood was a regional flood, that occurred a few centuries later than the global one survived by Noah's family. On the basis of the archaeological stele known as the Parian Chronicle, Deucalion's Flood was usually fixed as occurring some time around 1528 BC. Deucalion's flood may be dated in the chronology of Saint Jerome to  1460 BC. According to Augustine of Hippo (City of God XVIII,8,10,&11), Deucalion and his father Prometheus were contemporaries of Moses. According to Clement of Alexandria in his Stromata, "...in the time of Crotopus occurred the burning of Phaethon, and the deluges of Deucalion."

Deucalionids 
The descendants of Deucalion and Pyrrha are below:

 Hellen, Amphictyon, Orestheus, Candybus, Protogeneia, Pandora II, Thyia, Melantho, Pronous, Marathonius are their children.
 Aeolus, Dorus, Xuthus, Aetolus, Physcus, Aethlius, Graecus, Makednos, Magnes and Delphus are their grandsons.

Notes

Sources 
 Hesiod, Catalogue of Women fragments 2–7 and 234 (7th or 6th century BC)
 Hecataeus of Miletus, frag. 341 (500 BC)
 Pindar, Olympian Odes 9 (466 BC)
 Plato, "Timaeus" 22B, "Critias" 112A (4th century BC)
 Apollonius of Rhodes, Argonautica 3.1086 (3rd century BC)
 Virgil, Georgics 1.62 (29 BC)
 Gaius Julius Hyginus, Fabulae 153; Poeticon astronomicon 2.29 (c. 20 BC)
 Dionysius of Halicarnassus, Roman Antiquities 1.17.3 (c. 15 BC)
 Ovid, Metamorphoses, 1.318ff.; 7.356 (c. 8 AD)
 Strabo, Geographica, 9.4 (c. 23 AD)
 Bibliotheca 1.7.2 (c. 1st century AD?)
 Plutarch, Life of Pyrrhus, 1 (75 AD)
 Lucian, De Dea Syria 12, 13, 28, 33 (2nd century AD)
 Pausanias, Description of Greece 10.38.1 (2nd century AD)
 Nonnus, Dionysiaca 3.211; 6.367 (c. 500 AD)

References 

 Apollodorus, The Library with an English Translation by Sir James George Frazer, F.B.A., F.R.S. in 2 Volumes, Cambridge, MA, Harvard University Press; London, William Heinemann Ltd. 1921. ISBN 0-674-99135-4. Online version at the Perseus Digital Library. Greek text available from the same website.
 Apollonius Rhodius, Argonautica translated by Robert Cooper Seaton (1853-1915), R. C. Loeb Classical Library Volume 001. London, William Heinemann Ltd, 1912. Online version at the Topos Text Project.
 Apollonius Rhodius, Argonautica. George W. Mooney. London. Longmans, Green. 1912. Greek text available at the Perseus Digital Library.
 Dionysus of Halicarnassus, Roman Antiquities. English translation by Earnest Cary in the Loeb Classical Library, 7 volumes. Harvard University Press, 1937-1950. Online version at Bill Thayer's Web Site
 Dionysius of Halicarnassus, Antiquitatum Romanarum quae supersunt, Vol I-IV. . Karl Jacoby. In Aedibus B.G. Teubneri. Leipzig. 1885. Greek text available at the Perseus Digital Library.
 Gaius Julius Hyginus, Astronomica from The Myths of Hyginus translated and edited by Mary Grant. University of Kansas Publications in Humanistic Studies. Online version at the Topos Text Project.
 Gaius Julius Hyginus, Fabulae from The Myths of Hyginus translated and edited by Mary Grant. University of Kansas Publications in Humanistic Studies. Online version at the Topos Text Project.
 Hesiod, Catalogue of Women from Homeric Hymns, Epic Cycle, Homerica translated by Evelyn-White, H G. Loeb Classical Library Volume 57. London: William Heinemann, 1914. Online version at theio.com
 Nonnus of Panopolis, Dionysiaca translated by William Henry Denham Rouse (1863-1950), from the Loeb Classical Library, Cambridge, MA, Harvard University Press, 1940.  Online version at the Topos Text Project.
 Nonnus of Panopolis, Dionysiaca. 3 Vols. W.H.D. Rouse. Cambridge, MA., Harvard University Press; London, William Heinemann, Ltd. 1940-1942. Greek text available at the Perseus Digital Library.
 Pausanias, Description of Greece with an English Translation by W.H.S. Jones, Litt.D., and H.A. Ormerod, M.A., in 4 Volumes. Cambridge, MA, Harvard University Press; London, William Heinemann Ltd. 1918. . Online version at the Perseus Digital Library
 Pausanias, Graeciae Descriptio. 3 vols. Leipzig, Teubner. 1903.  Greek text available at the Perseus Digital Library.
 Pindar, Odes translated by Diane Arnson Svarlien. 1990. Online version at the Perseus Digital Library.
 Pindar, The Odes of Pindar including the Principal Fragments with an Introduction and an English Translation by Sir John Sandys, Litt.D., FBA. Cambridge, MA., Harvard University Press; London, William Heinemann Ltd. 1937. Greek text available at the Perseus Digital Library.
 Plato, Critias in Plato in Twelve Volumes, Vol. 9 translated by W.R.M. Lamb. Cambridge, Massachusetts, Harvard University Press; London, William Heinemann Ltd. 1925. Online version at the Perseus Digital Library. Greek text available at the same website.
 Plato, Timaeus in Plato in Twelve Volumes, Vol. 9 translated by W.R.M. Lamb. Cambridge, Massachusetts, Harvard University Press; London, William Heinemann Ltd. 1925. Online version at the Perseus Digital Library. Greek text available at the same website.
Plutarch, Plutarch's Lives. With an English Translation by Bernadotte Perrin. Cambridge, MA. Harvard University Press. London. William Heinemann Ltd. 1920. Online version at the Perseus Digital Library. Greek text available at the same website.
 Publius Ovidius Naso, Metamorphoses translated by Brookes More (1859-1942). Boston, Cornhill Publishing Co. 1922. Online version at the Perseus Digital Library.
 Publius Ovidius Naso, Metamorphoses. Hugo Magnus. Gotha (Germany). Friedr. Andr. Perthes. 1892. Latin text available at the Perseus Digital Library.
 Publius Vergilius Maro, Bucolics, Aeneid, and Georgics of Vergil. J. B. Greenough. Boston. Ginn & Co. 1900. Online version at the Perseus Digital Library.
Lucian, The Syrian goddess; being a translation of Lucian's De dea Syria, with a life of Lucian by Herbert A. Strong. Edited with notes and an introd. by John Garstang. London: Constable & Company Ltd. 1913. Online version at the Internet Archive. Greek text available at the Perseus Digital Library
 Strabo, The Geography of Strabo. Edition by H.L. Jones. Cambridge, Mass.: Harvard University Press; London: William Heinemann, Ltd. 1924. Online version at the Perseus Digital Library.
 Strabo, Geographica edited by A. Meineke. Leipzig: Teubner. 1877. Greek text available at the Perseus Digital Library.

External links 

 Deucalion from Charles Smith, Dictionary of Greek and Roman Biography and Mythology (1867), with source citations and some variants not given here.
 Deucalion from Carlos Parada, Genealogical Guide to Greek Mythology.
 Images of Deucalion and Pyrrha in the Warburg Institute Iconographic Database 

Legendary progenitors
Mythological kings of Thessaly
Kings in Greek mythology
Deucalionids
Demigods in classical mythology
Metamorphoses characters
Thessalian characters in Greek mythology
Thessalian mythology
Deeds of Zeus
Flood myths